Acanthaphritis is a genus of bony fish which are part of the subfamily Hemerocoetinae of the duckbill family Percophidae. They have an Indo-Pacific distribution.

Species
There are four recognised species in Acanthaphritis:

 Acanthaphritis barbata (Okamura & Kishida, 1963)
 Acanthaphritis grandisquamis Günther, 1880
 Acanthaphritis ozawai (McKay, 1971)
 Acanthaphritis unoorum Suzuki & Nakabo, 1996

References

Percophidae